Yuji Kasama (born 2 July 1959) is a Japanese volleyball player. He competed in the men's tournament at the 1988 Summer Olympics.

References

1959 births
Living people
Japanese men's volleyball players
Olympic volleyball players of Japan
Volleyball players at the 1988 Summer Olympics
People from Yanagawa, Fukuoka
Sportspeople from Fukuoka Prefecture